Castel Sismondo is a castle in Rimini, Romagna, northern Italy.

History
The present castle was built by Sigismondo Pandolfo Malatesta, lord of Rimini, beginning on March 20, 1437, but only the central nucleus of this structure remains. According to the contemporary chronicles, Malatesta designed it, although it is known that several architects worked on the construction, including Filippo Brunelleschi, who visited Rimini for two months in 1438. Construction lasted some 15 years.

The castle-palace originally was surrounded by a large moat, with a ravelin at the main entrance, sporting the heraldic symbols of the House of Malatesta. The walls were thought to be thick enough to bear the impact of the new artillery pieces of that period. Although originally positioned externally from the city, it has no towers facing that side: all towers are in fact oriented towards the city. These towers are square, and once housed a bronze cannon each.

The central part of the castle was also the Malatesta residence, with rooms decorated with tapestries, curtains and frescoes. Also the exterior was decorated, as suggested by the few maiolica tiles visible. Sigismondo Pandolfo Malatesta died here in 1468.

In 1821 the castle was turned into barracks for the local Carabinieri. Five years later, the external walls were demolished and the moat filled. After a period of decline, the edifice is now used for cultural exhibitions.

References

External links
Page at www.riminiturismo.it 

Buildings and structures in Rimini
Sismondo
Renaissance architecture in Emilia-Romagna
Tourist attractions in Emilia-Romagna
Sigismondo Pandolfo Malatesta